Raimondo Poerio,  O.P. was a Roman Catholic prelate who served as Bishop of Belcastro (1474–1518).

Biography
Raimondo Poerio was ordained a priest in the Order of Preachers.
In September 1474, he was appointed during the papacy of Pope Sixtus IV as Bishop of Belcastro.
He served as Bishop of Belcastro until his resignation on 9 August 1518.

References

External links and additional sources
 (for Chronology of Bishops) 
 (for Chronology of Bishops) 

15th-century Italian Roman Catholic bishops
16th-century Italian Roman Catholic bishops
Bishops appointed by Pope Sixtus IV
Dominican bishops